Bazouges-la-Pérouse (Gallo: Bazój-la-Pérózz) is a commune in the Ille-et-Vilaine department in Brittany in northwestern France.

Population

Inhabitants of Bazouges-la-Pérouse are called Bazougeais in French.

Sights
There are three historical monuments :

The Château de la Ballue is now a hotel.
A house which dates from 1604.
A half-timbered house (17th century)

See also
Communes of the Ille-et-Vilaine department

References

External links

Mayors of Ille-et-Vilaine Association 

Communes of Ille-et-Vilaine